William MacDonald is an American film and television producer and writer.

Career
MacDonald has an undergraduate degree from Georgetown University and a Juris Doctor degree from Fordham University in New York.

MacDonald worked in international trade and business affairs. Eventually he rose to run Hollywood producer Robert Evans' production company at Paramount Pictures.

MacDonald has a producer, co-producer or executive producer credit on Sliver, Jade, An Occasional Hell, Rough Riders, Molly and One Man's Hero. He co-wrote one episode for the TNT series, Witchblade, which ran from 2001–2002.

He was also a co-creator of the HBO original series Rome (in association of the BBC) along with John Milius and Bruno Heller. MacDonald served as an executive producer and writer on the series. The episode Caesarion (2005) was written by MacDonald.

MacDonald also wrote an unproduced screenplay based on Iris Chang's bestselling novel The Rape of Nanking.

Filmography
He was a producer in all films unless otherwise noted.

Film

As an actor

Television

As writer

References

External links

Living people
American film producers
American television producers
American television writers
Place of birth missing (living people)
Year of birth missing (living people)
American male television writers
Georgetown University alumni
Fordham University alumni